The 1939 Cincinnati Bearcats football team was an American football team that represented the University of Cincinnati as an independent during the 1939 college football season. The Bearcats were led by head coach Joseph A. Meyer and compiled a 4–3–2 record.

Schedule

References

Cincinnati
Cincinnati Bearcats football seasons
Cincinnati Bearcats football